USS Abatan (AW-4) was a Pasig-class distilling ship built for the United States Navy during World War II, named after the Abatan River located in the southwestern part of Bohol Island in the Philippines.

Originally laid down as SS Mission San Lorenzo under a Maritime Commission contract on 9 June 1944 at Sausalito, California by the Marinship Corporation, she was renamed USS Abatan on 25 July 1944 in anticipation of her acquisition by the Navy and simultaneously designated AO-92 for naval service as an oiler, launched on 6 August 1944, sponsored by Mrs. John A. McCone, transferred to the Navy on 28 November 1944 at the Mare Island Navy Yard, Vallejo, California, converted there for naval service, completed as a distilling ship, redesignated USS Abatan (AW-4) on 24 August 1944 and placed in commission on 29 January 1945.

Service history

World War II, 1945
Late in February, the new distilling ship got underway for shakedown training off the coast of southern California. She left the continental United States on the 28th and shaped a course for the Western Caroline Islands. After pausing en route at Eniwetok, Abatan reached Ulithi on 21 March and remained there for more than six months providing potable water to various types of landing craft, patrol vessels, and escort ships. During this period of her service, Japan capitulated in mid-August.

Post-war activities, 1945–1946
The ship sailed for Okinawa on 1 October, and stopped en route at Samar, Philippine Islands, to take on fresh water before continuing on to the Ryukyus. She reached her destination on 11 October and began issuing water to various fleet units. The ship left Okinawa on 15 November and set a course for Shanghai, China. She touched at that port on the 18th and remained stationed there through April 1946. The vessel left Chinese waters on 2 May and sailed via Okinawa to the Marshall Islands. Abatan reached Eniwetok on 31 May and assumed duties in connection with "Operation Crossroads," a series of tests conducted to determine the effects of atomic explosions upon warships. She was involved in this project until 27 June, when she weighed anchor and got underway for Kwajalein. The distilling ship arrived there the next day and remained in port providing potable water through 17 July. She then commenced a voyage to the east coast of the United States. The vessel visited Pearl Harbor, Hawaii, in late July; transited the Panama Canal; reported to the Atlantic Fleet in mid-August; and then proceeded to Philadelphia, Pennsylvania. She arrived there on 20 August and entered a preinactivation availability phase.

Decommissioned, 1947 –1962
Abatan was placed out of commission, in reserve, on 27 January 1947 and was berthed at Philadelphia. Her name was struck from the Navy list on 1 July 1960, and the ship was transferred to the Maritime Administration for layup in the James River.

Water storage ship, 1962–1979
Abatan was reacquired by the Navy and reinstated on the Navy list on 27 September 1962 for use as a backup fresh water storage ship at the Naval Base, Guantánamo Bay, Cuba. She was again struck from the Naval Vessel Register on 1 May 1970 but was retained as a hulk for storing water at Guantánamo Bay.

References

Pasig-class distilling ships
Ships built in Sausalito, California
1944 ships
World War II distilling ships of the United States